Beat It! is a rhythm game for the iOS developed by Glu Mobile and released November 17, 2009.

Critical reception
The game has a Metacritic rating of 88% based on 6 critic reviews.

SlideToPlay said "Audiophiles have just become the target audience for a new type of music game. " 148Apps wrote "The marriage of pixel art and beat machine is a match made in heaven, and brings some welcome innovation to the rhythm game genre. " IGN said "Beat It! is my favorite iPhone music game of 2009. " PocketgamerUK said "A new approach to rhythmic gaming that marries substance with style, its unique gameplay proving you can provide a fresh experience in a saturated genre. " Touchgen wrote "This is one of those games that you absolutely have to play with using headphones. The beats are all super clean and catchy, and they sound crappy on the iPhone's speakers. " TouchArcade said "Even if it doesn't have the same brain-stimulating effect on other people that it had on me, the game is a game worth playing for everyone, not just those who are already fans of music games like Guitar Hero. Beat It! is a delight to play, and a true brain-teasing, unique experience. "

References

2009 video games
Android (operating system) games
Music video games
IOS games
Video games developed in the United States
Single-player video games
Glu Mobile games